A cold plate is a popular dish with origins in rural Newfoundland, Canada.

It is generally served as a mid-day or evening meal. Often in Newfoundland cold plates are served at weddings and large gatherings.  The ability to prepare this dish almost entirely in advance makes it amenable to such purposes.

Cold plates are also commonly prepared and sold at community fundraisers in rural Newfoundland.

Components of a cold plate include:
 A serving each of turkey breast, ham, and roast beef.
 Pasta salad
 Various mashed potato based salads:
Beet salad
 Mustard salad
 Vegetable salad
 Lettuce
 Tomato
 Dressing (traditional Newfoundland turkey stuffing prepared with Newfoundland Savory)
 Cranberry (optional)
 Fresh baked dinner roll (usually white bread)
 A serving of jelly salad (also referred to as a Jello salad)
 Coleslaw

Meals
Cuisine of Newfoundland and Labrador